South Bank is an industrial town in the Redcar and Cleveland borough in North Yorkshire, England on the south bank of the River Tees. The town is served by  railway station.

The namesake ward had a population of 6,548 at the 2011 census. It forms part of the Teesside built-up area's Middlesbrough subdivision in 2011. The area is part of Greater Eston; which also includes Eston, Grangetown, Normanby, Teesville and part of Ormesby.

Ormesby's ancient parish was split into civil parishes. The area was in Normanby civil parish. In 1894, the area gained a higher population with South Bank in Normanby Urban District Council created. A town hall was built for the district in 1878 and was demolished before the urban district merged with Eston Urban District in 1915. The Eston Urban District was abolished in 1968 with the district becoming part of the County Borough of Teesside. In 1974, the county borough, with the area remaining unparished.

History
Formerly known as "Tees Tilery", South Bank has a long history of steelmaking in the companies Bolckow Vaughan and Dorman Long, and shipbuilding at Smiths Dock Company. The area was also known by the nickname of "Slaggy Island" as it was surrounded by slag heaps.

It was part of the parish of Eston and formed part of the Middlesbrough constituency from 1867 until 1918.

Shipbuilding

In 1907, Smiths Dock Company, a firm of shipbuilders from North Shields, set up part of its business on the River Tees at South Bank. Smiths Dock closed its North Shields Yard in 1909 focussing its operations on the River Tees.

In 1966 Smith's Dock merged with Swan Hunter & Wigham Richardson to form Associated Shipbuilders, later to become Swan Hunter Group.

In 1968, the company completed the first British-built and owned container ship, Manchester Challenge of 12,039 gross register tons, for operation on Manchester Liners new container service to ports on the St Lawrence Seaway, Canada. By 1971, the company had delivered three further ships of this design to Manchester Liners.

South Bank's shipbuilding era came to an end on 15 October 1986, when the last ship was launched from Smith's Dock, the shipyard itself closing in February 1987. The dock was re-used as Tees Offshore Base in 1988 and became home to offshore service industry companies including Tees Dockyard. Tees Dockyard was bought by Cammell Laird in 1998. On 15 April 2001, Cammell Laird closed the ship repair yard.

Politics

South Bank is part of the Redcar Parliamentary constituency, which is represented by Jacob Young of the Conservative Party in the House of Commons.

Borough Council 

In the 2019 local elections, the following members were returned to Redcar and Cleveland Borough Council:

Places of worship

The original Catholic parish of St. Peter was formed in 1874, followed by St. Mary's, in nearby Grangetown, in 1886. Together they served the Irish and Lithuanian immigrants who worked in the smelting works by the River Tees. These days, South Bank's Catholic Church is part of a larger parish, which includes the churches of St. Anne's, Eston and St. Andrew's, Teesville. The joint parish is served from, and carries the name of, St. Andrew's Parish.

The Anglican Communion is represented by the church of St. John the Evangelist. The foundation stone for the church was laid in 1893, and was completed two years later in 1895. It is part of the Deanery of Middlesbrough within the Diocese of York.

The South Bank Baptist Church also dates from the late 19th century and the 'non-aligned' South Bank Mission, although not in its original building, was founded in 1908.

Other established places of worship include the Redcar and Cleveland Islamic and Quranic Cultural Association, which mostly serves the Bangladeshi community.

Notable people
 Steve Buxton, footballer
 Ken Churchill, paralympic Athlete
 Greg Clark, Conservative MP, Secretary of State for Business, Energy and Industrial Strategy since 2016.
 Jack Curtis, footballer
 Paul Daniels, magician
Florence Easton, soprano
Vin Garbutt, folk singer
 Wilf Mannion, footballer
 David Mulholland, artist
 Dusty Rhodes, footballer
 Paul Truscott (boxer)

See also
St Peter's Catholic College, South Bank

References

Sources

External links 

 The Homepage of the South Bank Nostalgia Society (archived version)
 Tribute to the late South Bank painter David Mulholland
 List of warships built at Smith's Dock (and other North-East yards)
 South Bank built ships sailing with the Blue Star line

Redcar and Cleveland
Places in the Tees Valley
Towns in North Yorkshire
Greater Eston